Avijõgi is a river in Jõgeva and Lääne-Viru County, Estonia. The river is 62.2 km long and basin size is 391 km2. It runs into Peipus Lake.

Trouts and Thymallus thymallus live also in the river.

References

Rivers of Estonia
Jõgeva County
Lääne-Viru County